Hessus or Hessos was a town of the Ozolian Locrians, upon the coast of the Corinthian Gulf, and on the road to Naupactus.

Its site is unlocated.

References

Populated places in Ozolian Locris
Former populated places in Greece
Lost ancient cities and towns
Gulf of Corinth